The Northwestern Himalayan alpine shrub and meadows is a montane grasslands and shrublands ecoregion of the elevations of the northwestern Himalaya of  China, India, and Pakistan.

Setting
They are found in Himachal Pradesh and Jammu and Kashmir in northwestern India and in Khyber Pakhtunkhwa and Gilgit Baltistan in northern Pakistan.

Flora
This ecoregion's flora is composed mostly of krummholz and herbaceous plants.

Various rhododendrons live in the scrub habitat near timberline, as do junipers and birches. Although several species of rhododendron are recorded in this ecoregion, they are represented by a lesser greater diversity than in the eastern Himalaya, where 60 species are reported in the Northeastern Himalayan subalpine conifer forests.

Genera of herbaceous plants include Doronicum, Delphinium, Gentiana, Meconopsis, Pedicularis, Anemone, Aster, Polygonum, Primula, and Mertensia. Scree habitats include Caragana, Saxifraga, Draba, and Gypsophila.

Fauna
Eighty mammals species are reported in this ecoregion. It contains prime habitat for the snow leopard and the Tibetan wolf. Other mammals include the ibex, markhor, blue sheep, tahr, and Himalayan marmot.

There are 172 bird species in this ecoregion. Important birds include the lammergeier, golden eagle, Himalayan griffon vulture, snow partridge, Tibetan snowcock, and Himalayan snowcock.

Conservation
This ecoregion is well preserved because of high elevation, difficult climate, and lack of trees. Protected areas include:
Pin Valley National Park
Great Himalayan National Park
Kishtwar National Park

See also
List of ecoregions in India

References

External links
 

Ecoregions of Afghanistan
Ecoregions of China
Ecoregions of India
Ecoregions of Pakistan
Ecoregions of the Himalayas
Environment of Tibet

Grasslands of India
Grasslands of Pakistan
Montane grasslands and shrublands
Palearctic ecoregions